Margrave Philip of Hachberg-Sausenberg (1454 – 9 September 1503) was the son of the Margrave Rudolf IV of Hachberg-Sausenberg and Margaret of Vienne. Philip reigned in 1487–1503 as Margrave of Hachberg-Sausenberg and Count of Neuchâtel. From 1466 he called himself Lord of Badenweiler.

Family 

As part of his alliance with France, Philip married Maria of Savoy, daughter of Amadeus IX of Savoy, and one of the nieces of Louis XI, King of France, around 1476 or 1478. With Philip's death, the male line of the Hachberg-Sausenberg family died out.

Philip's father, Rudolf IV, had begun negotiations with the senior line of the House of Zahringen (of which Rudolf's Hachberg-Sausenberg line was a cadet branch), which ruled the margraviate of Baden on the possibility of an inheritance treaty. Philip continued the negotiations with Christopher I, Margrave of Baden and on 31 August 1490, they came to an agreement on reciprocal inheritance. The treaty is known as the "Rötteln Match". The background of this treaty was that Christopher I intended his son and heir Philip I to marry Joan, the heiress of Hachberg-Sausenberg. This marriage did not materialize, due to political pressure from the French king.

His daughter, Johanna of Hachberg-Sausenberg (born ca. 1485 – died 1543), became Countess of Neuchâtel after her father's death in 1503, while Christopher obtained Sausenberg, Rötteln, Badenweiler and Schopfheim. In 1504, she married Louis d'Orléans-Longueville who, not yet having inherited his father's dukedom of Longueville, became known, jure uxoris, as the Marquis de Rothelin (Rötteln) (after Joan died in 1543, her son François assumed the title of Marquis de Rothelin, thereby starting the cadet line of Orléans-Rothelin). Joan and the House of Orléans-Longueville contested the Rötteln treaty and they tried to rally support for their case from the Swiss cantons of Solothurn, Luzern, Fribourg and Bern. The dispute was settled in 1581, with the House of Baden paying  to the House of Orléans-Longueville, but securing for Christopher's great-grandson Margrave Georg Friedrich of Baden-Durlach Sausenberg, Rötteln and Badenweiller in 1584.

Territorial rule 
In 1493 Philip lost his territories in County of Burgundy because of his close connection to the French court.  The French king then appointed him to Governor and Great Seneschal of Provence.

Other activities 
In 1474 and 1475, he participated in the Burgundian sieges of Neuss and Nancy; in 1476 he fought with Charles the Bold in the battles of Grandson and Murten.

After the defeat of Charles the Bold in the 1477 Battle of Nancy, Margrave Philip turned away from Burgundy and sided with France, in an effort to avoid losing his Burgundian possessions.  In 1484, Philip participated in the coronation of the French King Charles VIII in Reims.

The king sent Philip to Switzerland as a negotiator.  Philip was appointed Marshal of Burgundy (which had become a French possession after the Battle of Nancy) and Philip de Hochberg, as he was called in France, had a strong influence on politics there.  In 1484, he was appointed Chamberlain and in 1489, he became a member of the Royal Council of France.  In 1499, he fought on the French side, while his subjects from Rötteln fought in the Imperial army.

In 1494 Philip inaugurated a new mansion at his Rötteln Castle.  The interior of the Palace at Neuchâtel is also attributed to him.

He died in Montpellier, aged about 59.

References and sources 
 Fritz Schülin: Rötteln-Haagen, Beiträge zur Orts-, Landschafts- und Siedlungsgeschichte, Lörrach, 1965, pp. 80–82.
 Fritz Schülin: Binzen, Beiträge zur Orts-, Landschafts- und Siedlungsgeschichte, Schopfheim, 1967, p. 525/526 (Genealogy of the House of Hachberg-Sausenberg).
 Karl Seith: Die Burg Rötteln im Wandel ihrer Herrengeschlechter, Ein Beitrag zur Geschichte und Baugeschichte der Burg, special edition published by Röttelbund e.V. in Haagen, place and year unknown, pp. 23–28; cited by Schülin as In: Markgräflerland, vol. 3, issue 1, 1931
 Hans Jakob Wörner: Das Markgräflerland – Bemerkungen zu seinem geschichtlichen Werdegang, in: Das Markgräflerland, issue 2/1994, Schopfheim, 1994, p. 64
 August Huber: Über Basels Anteil am Röteler Erbfolgestreit im Jahre 1503, in: Basler Zeitschrift für Geschichte und Altertumskunde, vol. 4, 1905, online
 Johann Christian Sachs: Einleitung in die Geschichte der Marggravschaft und des marggrävlichen altfürstlichen Hauses Baden, Frankfurt and Leipzig, 1764, part 1, pp. 575–588
 The inheritance treaty is reprinted in: John Staub: The contract of inheritance between Margrave Christoph I of Baden, Margrave Philip of Hachberg of 31 Aug. 1490, in: The Markgräflerland, No. 1 / 1991, Schopfheim, 1991, pp. 93–103

External links

Footnotes

Gallery

Philip
People from the canton of Neuchâtel
Counts of Neuchâtel
1454 births
1503 deaths
15th-century German people